And I Thought About You is a Patti Page album, issued by Mercury Records as a 10" long-playing record, as catalog number MG-25209 in 1955. This was her eighth album for Mercury.

Reception 
Billboard magazine liked it saying "Mercury's top songbird is in fine vocal form here on a group of eight preferred standards... Patti Page sings a ballad with tenderness, taste, and, most important of all, warm sincerity.  Her fans are bound to consider this package a “must” buy, and deejays will find it a perfect programming for romantic wax segs."

Track listing

References 

Patti Page albums
1955 albums